January Joy is the only studio album by American singer Mashonda, released in Japan in November 2005 via J Records and Full Surface Records. The album features tracks, produced by Swizz Beatz and Kanye West, including two singles: "Back Of Da Club" and "Blackout". The album failed to chart.

Track listing

Samples
"Out There" by Willie Hutch on The World Is Ours
"Friends Or Lovers" by Act 1 on Used To
"I Can't Believe (Someone Like You Could Really Love Me)" by Sarah Dash on Hold Me
"The Highways of My Life" by The Isley Brothers on Lonely
"Groovin'" by Willie Mitchell on Why I Love You
Lyrical interpolations
"Do for Love by 2Pac on No One Else

References

2005 debut albums
Albums produced by Kanye West
Albums produced by Raphael Saadiq
Albums produced by Swizz Beatz
J Records albums
Full Surface Records albums
Mashonda albums